Rateb Y. Rabie, KCHS is a Jordanian-born activist who is the founder and president of the Holy Land Christian Ecumenical Foundation (HCEF).   He is also the co-founder and past president of the Birzeit Society.

Personal
Rabie was born in 1954 in Amman, Jordan to Palestinian parents. Rabie went to the United States in 1976 for his college education.

In 1980, Rabie married Rocio Rabie, a native of Ecuador whom he met in the United States. The couple has four daughters and two  grandsons.

Rabie is a Knight Commander of the Equestrian Order of Holy Sepulcher, and the 4th Degree Knight of Columbus. In 2007, The Arab American Anti-Discrimination Committee (ADC) conferred upon  Rabie the Faith and Tolerance Award.

HCEF 
Rabie founded HCEF in 1998 with other Arab and Palestinian Christians in the West Bank. HCEF is a charitable faith-based development organization, with over 20 programs, and offices in Washington, DC and Bethlehem.

KTH
In 2011, Rabie founded the Know Thy Heritage (KTH) Leadership Program, along with Hashim Shawa, chairman and General Manager of Bank of Palestine, Samer Khoury President Engineering & Construction of Consolidated Contractors Company, and other business people.

KTH helps to familiarize Palestinian youth living abroad with the tools with the Palestinian culture in Palestine. The second project is the promoting  business and investment in Palestine by expatriate Palestinians and other investors.  Rabie is a promoter of the Bethlehem Museum of History, Heritage, and Culture.

Achievements
Rabie has worked to improved living conditions for Palestinian Christians and preserving Palestine's Christian heritage. He advocates for peace and justice in Palestine with the U.S. Congress, the State Department, and the White House.

Rabie has organized over 20 international conferences of religious, civic and political leaders, Muslim, Jews, and Christians to promote justice and tolerance in the Middle East.

Rabie formed a coalition of major U.S. Muslim organizations and Christian Churches with the goal of protecting Christians and other religious minorities in Arab countries. The coalition elected him as chair of the steering committee.

Personal life

References

Sources
 http://palestiniansurprises.com/surprise/rateb-rabie/
 http://www.arabamerica.com/arab-american-perspectives-on-pope-francis-u-s-visit/
 http://www.idcsummit.org/sir-rateb-rabie-bio/
 http://thearabdailynews.com/2014/09/22/podcast-sir-rateb-rabie-middle-east-christians/
 http://www.medjugorje.ws/en/articles/rateb-rabie-holy-land-christian-ecumenical-foundation-visit-medjugorje/
 http://ncronline.org/person/rateb-rabie
 http://islamicommentary.org/tag/rateb-rabie/
 http://www.anti-semitism.net/christian/sir-rateb-rabie-being-talked-about-unity-of-muslismchristian.php
 http://english.pnn.ps/2015/10/25/hcef-holds-awards-banquet-at-annual-international-conference/
 http://www.prleap.com/pr/42251/dr-leon-hesser-palestinian-sir-rateb-rabie-seek
 http://theamericanmuslim.org/tam.php/features/articles/u.s.-muslim-christian-coalition-formed-to-protect-religious-minorities-in-a
 http://fravelinogonzalez.com/2015/10/03/saint-gabriel-catholic-church-receives-gift-from-the-palestinian-christians/
 http://www.aaiusa.org/what-you-might-have-missed-from-the-in-defense-of-christians-summit
 http://www.arabamerica.com/arab-american-perspectives-on-pope-francis-u-s-visit/
 http://houseofdeputies.org/episcopal-church-invests-in-bank-of-palestine.html
 http://en.abouna.org/en/holylands/society-st-yves-receive-2015-living-stones-solidarity-award
 http://www.comeandsee.com/view.php?sid=1058

1954 births
Living people